The Madagascar harrier-hawk (Polyboroides radiatus) is a very large species of bird of prey in the family Accipitridae, endemic to Madagascar.

Description
The Madagascar harrier-hawk is a largish raptor with long and broad wings which when folded almost reach to the tip of the tail. It has a black tail with a single broad grey band bisecting the black half way along its length, Adult birds are grey above with blackish flight feathers. The underparts are white with dense dark barring on the breast, belly and underwing coverts while the upper breast and throat are the same colour as the upperparts and form a grey hood, broken by the yellow face. The bill is yellow with a black tip and the legs are yellow.

Distribution
The Madagascar harrier-hawk is quite widespread and common, albeit in small numbers, in most regions of Madagascar but it is scarce on the deforested central plateau. It can be found from sea level to  altitude.

Habitat
The Madagascar harrier-hawk occurs in a variety of habitats but seems to favour undisturbed lowland rainforest. It has also been recorded from montane rainforest, spiny desert scrub, degraded forests and other wooded habitats, including plantations of exotic trees.

Habits
Nesting has been observed the months of September, October, and November. The eggs are brooded by both sexes and hatch asynchronously, with the older sibling often killing its younger brood mates. Fledging takes about seven weeks. On at least one occasion a nest was found within a colony of Sakalava weavers.

The Madagascar harrier-hawk has a varied diet and has been recorded eating small birds, rodents, reptiles, insects, small lemurs. Like the African harrier-hawk they possess the unusual morphological adaptation of having an intertarsal joint that allows their legs to flex backwards and forwards. This means that they can use their feet to probe and remove prey from hidden sites such as holes in tree trunks, weaver nests and rock crevices where they can extract nestling birds from such normally inaccessible places.

Taxonomic notes
The Madagascar harrier-hawk forms a superspecies with the African harrier-hawk and has been regarded by some authorities as a subspecies of that species. However, if that is the case then the combined species would be called P. radiatus as this name has priority.

Gallery

References

External links

Madagascar harrier-hawk
Endemic birds of Madagascar
Birds of prey of Madagascar
Madagascar harrier-hawk
Madagascar harrier-hawk
Taxonomy articles created by Polbot